The 1975 Gillette Cup was the thirteenth Gillette Cup, an English limited overs county cricket tournament. It was held between 25 June and 6 September 1975. The tournament was won by Lancashire County Cricket Club who defeated Middlesex County Cricket Club by 7 wickets in the final at Lord's.

Format
The seventeen first-class counties, were joined by five Minor Counties: Buckinghamshire, Cambridgeshire, Cornwall, Oxfordshire and Staffordshire. Teams who won in the first round progressed to the second round. The winners in the second round then progressed to the quarter-final stage. Winners from the quarter-finals then progressed to the semi-finals from which the winners then went on to the final at Lord's which was held on 6 September 1975.

First round

Second round

Quarter-finals

Semi-finals

Final

References

External links
CricketArchive tournament page 

Friends Provident Trophy seasons
Gillette